Firma may refer to:

Firma, Missouri, a ghost town in the United States
Firma (supporter group), a Serbian football fan club
Firma, a monthly magazine supplement to the Globes (newspaper) newspaper
Firma (TV series), a 2005 Finnish TV series
Firma (hip hop group), a Polish hip hop group

See also
Die Firma, a German hip hop group
Terra firma (disambiguation)